D. Scott Bennett (born May 14, 1960) is an American political scientist and Distinguished Professor of Political Science at the Pennsylvania State University. He is also Senior Associate Dean for Research and Graduate Studies. Bennett is known for his works on international conflict.

References

Living people
American political scientists
Pennsylvania State University faculty
1960 births
Peace and conflict scholars